The following tables show results for the Australian House of Representatives at the 1987 federal election held on 11 July 1987.

Australia

States

New South Wales

Victoria

Queensland

Western Australia

South Australia

Tasmania

Territories

Australian Capital Territory

Northern Territory

See also
 Results of the 1987 Australian federal election (Senate)
 Members of the Australian House of Representatives, 1987–1990

References

House of Representatives 1987
Australian House of Representatives
1987 elections in Australia